Diaphorodoris alba is a species of sea slug, a dorid nudibranch, a shell-less marine gastropod mollusc in the family Calycidorididae.

Distribution
This species was described from Banyuls-sur-Mer and Villefranche-sur-Mer, France and Naples, Italy. It is reported from Pembrokeshire, Wales and on coasts of the Atlantic Ocean south to the Mediterranean Sea.

References

External links
 

Onchidorididae
Gastropods described in 1960